The 1921 APFA season was the second season of the American Professional Football Association, which was renamed the National Football League in 1922.

At the league meeting in Akron, Ohio on April 30 prior to the season, the Association was reorganized, with Joe Carr of the Columbus Panhandles named as president. The Association's headquarters was moved to Columbus, Ohio, and a league constitution and by-laws were drafted, giving teams territorial rights, restricting player movements, and developing membership criteria for the franchises. 

The league would play under the rules of college football, and official standings were issued for the first time so that there would be a clear champion: the most notable change was that only games played against league teams would count toward the standings, which had the dual effect of both encouraging independent teams (such as those from the Ohio League and the NYPFL) to join, and also causing those that did not join to fold within a few years, as NFL teams, particularly those competing for a championship, would be much less willing to play what were effectively exhibition games against teams that would not help them in the standings.

However, a number of teams had financial difficulties: some of the teams that played during the previous season, including the Chicago Tigers, had disbanded. The Association did increase to 21 teams, but four of the new teams (Brickley's New York Giants, the Cincinnati Celts, the Tonawanda Kardex, and the Washington Senators) only lasted a single season. New York and Tonawanda were particularly short-lived: New York lasted two games in the league, and Tonawanda a league-record one game, before leaving or folding. The Muncie Flyers also disbanded after the season, and even though the Cleveland Tigers changed their name to the Cleveland Indians, it still did not save them from folding after the season as well.

At one point, the Professional Football Researchers Association recognized a team by the name of the Syracuse Pros as joining and leaving the league in 1921; however, the league has not recognized the claim, and the PFRA has dropped this assertion in more recent years. The Syracuse professional team in question, which had never used the name "Pros", did intend to play at least seven games against APFA teams, but only played three, and there is no record of the league ever admitting the team into the league or of the team leaving the league. The only word of the Syracuse team joining the league came from the team itself.

The other new teams were the Evansville Crimson Giants, the Green Bay Packers, the Minneapolis Marines, and the Louisville Brecks. The Detroit Heralds became the Detroit Tigers, but folded mid-season, and its roster was absorbed by the Buffalo All-Americans.

After the season, the Packers were suspended following their admission to using Notre Dame players during the season, who had played under assumed names. Green Bay would return to the NFL a year later as a new franchise. 

The Staleys, who had moved from Decatur, Illinois, to Chicago before the season, were named the APFA Champions over the Buffalo All-Americans.

Teams
The number of APFA teams increased from 14 during the previous season to 21 in 1921.

De facto championship game

The Chicago Staleys (to be renamed the Chicago Bears after the end of the season), led by wide receiver George Halas, and the Buffalo All-Americans, led by quarterback Tommy Hughitt, were the two top teams in the league; each playing all of their games at home, Buffalo and Chicago amassed 6–0 records in league play. On Thanksgiving 1921, Buffalo played one of its only road games of the season, in Chicago, and prevailed 7–6. Chicago demanded a rematch.

The All-Americans agreed to rematch the Staleys on December 4, again in Chicago, on the condition that the game would be considered a "post-season" exhibition game not to be counted in the standings; had it not, Buffalo would have had an undefeated season and won the title. (Buffalo had played, and defeated, the Akron Pros just one day prior.) This was a fairly common custom of the time; both New York and Ohio's pre-NFL circuits put their marquee games on Thanksgiving weekend and cleaned up with mostly token opposition in the following weeks. Chicago defeated Buffalo in the rematch by a score of 10–7. Halas rebutted that the second game was played on December 4 (well before teams in Illinois typically stopped playing games in those days), and the Staleys played two more games against top opponents, the Canton Bulldogs and Racine Cardinals after the second Buffalo game (though, at the time of the Buffalo-Chicago matchup, Chicago had played three fewer games than Buffalo).

The league counted the All-Americans game in the standings, against Buffalo's wishes, resulting in Buffalo (9–1–2) and Chicago (9–1–1) being tied atop the standings. The league then implemented the first ever tiebreaker: a rule, now considered archaic and removed from league rulebooks, that stated if two teams played multiple times in a season, the last game between the two teams carried more weight. Thus, the Chicago victory actually counted more in the standings, giving Chicago the championship. Buffalo sports fans have been known to refer to this, justly or unjustly, as the "Staley Swindle," and have cited it as the first evidence of a sports curse on the city.

Had the current (post-1972) system of counting ties as half a win and half a loss been in place in 1921, the Staleys would have won the championship with a win percentage of .864, while the All-Americans would have finished second with .833. If the above game was excluded as per Buffalo's wishes, the All-Americans would have won with .909, and the Staleys would have finished second with .850.

Standings

References

NFL Record and Fact Book
NFL History 1921–1930 (Last accessed December 4, 2005)
Total Football: The Official Encyclopedia of the National Football League

1921